Dönitz (also spelled Doenitz) is a German-language surname. Notable people with the name Dönitz include:

Friedrich Karl Wilhelm Dönitz (1838–1912), German physician and zoologist
Hans-Joachim Dönitz (1934–2010), East German Navy officer
Karl Dönitz (1891–1980), German admiral and Nazi leader

German-language surnames